Jan van der Hoek (born 14 February 1940) is a Dutch volleyball player. He competed in the men's tournament at the 1964 Summer Olympics.

References

1940 births
Living people
Dutch men's volleyball players
Olympic volleyball players of the Netherlands
Volleyball players at the 1964 Summer Olympics
Sportspeople from Dordrecht